Electron diffraction refers to changes in the direction of electron beams due to interactions with atoms. The resulting map of the directions of the electrons after they have interacted is called a diffraction pattern. It is similar to x-ray and neutron diffraction. Electron diffraction can also refer to a set of experimental techniques used for material characterization. 

Electron diffraction occurs due to elastic scattering, when there is no change in the energy of the electrons during their interactions with atoms. The negatively charged electrons are scattered due to Coulomb forces when they interact with both the positively charged atomic core and the negatively charged electrons around the atoms; most of the interaction occurs quite close to the atoms, within about one Angstrom. In comparison, x-rays are scattered after interactions with only the electrons, specifically the electron density, while neutrons are scattered by the atomic nuclei through the strong nuclear force.

More rigorous details are given later; as a very simple introduction, all matter can be thought of as waves, from small particles such as electrons even up to chocolate brownies -- although it is impossible to measure any of the "wave-like" behavior of a brownie. Waves can move around objects and create interference patterns. A classic example is the Young's two-slit experiment shown in Figure 2, where a wave impinges upon two slits in the first of the two images. After going through the two slits there are directions where the wave is stronger, ones where it is weaker -- the wave has been diffracted. If instead of having two slits there are a number of small points then similar phenomena can occur as shown in the second image where the wave is coming in from the bottom right corner. This is comparable to electron diffraction where the small dots would be atoms. A map of the directions of the electrons leaving the sample will show high intensity (white) for favored directions, such as the three prominent ones in the Young's slits experiment of Figure 2, while the other directions will be low intensity (dark). Often there will be an array of spots (preferred directions) as in Figure 1 and the other figures shown later.

The most common use of electron diffraction is as a tool in transmission electron microscopy (TEM) with thin samples of tens to at most a thousand atoms in thickness, that is 1 nanometer to 100 nanometers. Some details on methods for sample preparation of thin samples can be found in the classic book by Edington, beyond that most of the information is within journal publications or the unpublished literature. There are many different ways to collect diffraction information in a TEM, all with their own advantages and disadvantages; some of these will be briefly described below. There are also many other ways to obtain and exploit electron diffraction. For instance, in scanning electron microscopy (SEM), electron backscatter diffraction is used to determine crystal orientation across the sample. Electron diffraction can also be used to characterize molecules in a gas using gas electron diffraction, surfaces using lower energy electrons, a technique called LEED, and by reflecting electrons off surfaces, a technique called RHEED.

Historical Background 
The historical background to electron diffraction involves several interweaving threads which sometimes merged, but also diverged. The first is the general background to electrons in vacuum and the technological developments that led to cathode-ray tubes as well as vacuum tubes that dominated early television and electronics; the second is how these led to the development of electron microscopes; the last is work on the nature of electron beams and the fundamentals of how electrons behave, a key component of quantum mechanics and the explanation of electron diffraction.

Electrons in Vacuum 

Experiments involving electron beams occurred long before the discovery of the electron; indeed, the name ēlektron comes from the Greek word for amber, which in turn is connected to the recording of electrostatic charging by Thales of Miletus around 585 BCE, and possibly others even earlier.

In 1650, Otto von Guericke invented the vacuum pump allowing for study of the effects of high voltage electricity passing through rarefied air. In 1838, Michael Faraday applied a high voltage between two metal electrodes at either end of a glass tube that had been partially evacuated of air, and noticed a strange light arc with its beginning at the cathode (negative electrode) and its end at the anode (positive electrode). Building on this In the 1850's, Heinrich Geissler was able to achieve a pressure of around 10−3 atmospheres, inventing what became known as Geissler tubes. Using these tubes, while studying electrical conductivity in rarefied gases in 1859 Julius Plücker observed that the radiation emitted from the negatively charged cathode caused phosphorescent light to appear on the tube wall near it, and the region of the phosphorescent light could be moved by application of a magnetic field.  

In 1869, Plücker's student Johann Wilhelm Hittorf found that a solid body placed between the cathode and the phosphorescence would cast a shadow on the tube, e,g, Figure 3. Hittorf inferred that there are straight rays emitted from the cathode and that the phosphorescence was caused by the rays striking the tube walls. In 1876, the German physicist Eugen Goldstein showed that the rays were emitted perpendicular to the cathode surface, which distinguished them from the incandescent light. Eugen Goldstein dubbed them cathode rays. By the 1870s William Crookes and others were able to evacuate glass tubes below 10−6 atmospheres, and observed that the glow in the whole tube disappeared when the pressure was reduced but the glass behind the anode began to glow. Crookes was also able to show that the particles in the cathode rays were negatively charged and could be deflected by an electromagnetic field.

In 1897, Joseph Thomson measured the mass of these cathode rays, proving they were made of particles. These particles, however, were 1800 times lighter than the lightest particle known at that time – a hydrogen atom. These were originally called corpuscle and later named the electron by George Johnstone Stoney.   

The control of electron beams that this work led to resulted in significant technology advances in electronic amplifiers and television displays; as an offshoot it also led to some important advances in our understanding of quantum mechanics, and later electron diffraction and the development of electron microscopes.

Waves, diffraction and quantum mechanics 

Completely independent of the developments for electrons in vacuum, at about the same time the components of quantum mechanics were being assembled. The understanding of electron beams was fundamentally changed in 1925, when  Louis de Broglie in his PhD thesis Recherches sur la théorie des quanta introduced his theory of electron waves. He pointed out that an atom around a nucleus could be thought of as being a standing wave, and that electrons and all matter could be considered as waves. He merged the idea of thinking about them as particles (or corpuscles), and of thinking of them as waves. He proposed that particles are bundles of waves (wave packets) which move with a group velocity and have an effective mass, see for instance Figure 4. Both of these depend upon the energy, which in turn connects to the wavevector and the relativistic formulation of Albert Einstein a few years before.

This rapidly became part of what was called by Erwin Schrödinger undulatory mechanics, what is now callled the Schrödinger equation or wave mechanics. As stated by de Broglie on September 8th 1927 in the preface to the German translation of his theses (in turn translated into English): M. Einstein from the beginning has supported my thesis, but it was M. E. Schrödinger who developed the propagation equations of a new theory and who in searching for its solutions has established what has become known as “Wave Mechanics”.
The Schrödinger equation combines the kinetic energy of waves and the potential energy due to, for electrons, the Coulomb potential. He was able to explain earlier work such as the quantization of the energy of electrons around atoms in the Bohr model, as well as many other phenomena. Waves in vacuum were automatically part of the solutions to his equation. 

Both the wave nature and the undulatory mechanics approach were experimentally confirmed for electron beams in two experiments performed independently, one by George Paget Thomson and Alexander Reid and the other the Davisson–Germer experiment. These were rapidly followed by the first non-relativistic dynamical diffraction model for electrons by Hans Bethe based upon the Schrödinger equation, which is very close to how electron diffraction is now described. This sparked a rapid development of electron-based analytical techniques in the 1930s from gas electron diffraction developed by Herman Mark and Raymond Weil, to the first electron microscopes developed by Max Knoll and Ernst Ruska.

Electron microscopes and early electron diffraction 

Just having an electron beam was not enough, it needed to be controlled. Many developments laid the groundwork of electron optics; see the paper by Calbick for an overview of the early work. One significant step was the work of Hertz in 1883 who made a cathode-ray tube with electrostatic and magnetic deflection, demonstrating manipulation of the direction of an electron beam. Others were focusing of the electrons by an axial magnetic field by Emil Wiechert in 1899, improved oxide-coated cathodes which produced more electrons by Arthur Wehnelt in 1905 and the development of the electromagnetic lens in 1926 by Hans Busch. 

Building an electron microscope involves combining these elements, similar to a optical microscope but with magnetic or electrostatic lenses instead of glass ones. To this day the issue of who invented the transmission electron microscope is controversial, as discussed by Mulvey and more recently by Tao. Extensive additional information can be found in the articles by Freundlich, Rüdenberg and Mulvey. 

One effort was university based. In 1928, at the Technical University of Berlin, Adolf Matthias (Professor of High Voltage Technology and Electrical Installations) appointed Max Knoll to lead a team of researchers to advance research on electron beams and cathode-ray oscilloscopes. The team consisted of several PhD students including Ernst Ruska. In 1931, Max Knoll and Ernst Ruska successfully generated magnified images of mesh grids placed over an anode aperture. The device, a replicate of which is shown in Figure 6, used two magnetic lenses to achieve higher magnifications, the first electron microscope. (Max Knoll died in 1969, so did not receive a share of the Nobel Prize in 1986, and is often forgotten.) 

Apparently independent of this effort was work at Siemens-Schuckert by Reinhold Rüdenberg. According to patent law (U.S. Patent No. 2058914 and 2070318, both filed in 1932), he is the inventor of the electron microscope, but it is not clear when he had a working instrument. He stated in a very brief article in 1932 that Siemens had been working on this for some years before the patents were filed in 1932, so his effort was parallel to the university effort. He died in 1961, so similar to Max Knoll, was not eligible for a share of the Nobel Prize.

These instruments could produce magnified images, but were not particularly useful for electron diffraction; indeed, the wave nature of electrons was not exploited during the development. Key at least for electron diffraction in microscopes was the advance in 1936 where Boersch showed that electron microscopes could be used as micro-diffraction cameras with an aperture -- the birth of selected area electron diffraction.

Less controversial than the development of the electron microscope and electron diffraction was the development of low-energy electron diffraction -- the early experiments of Davisson and Germer used this approach. As early as 1929 Germer investigated gas adsorption, and in 1932 Farnsworth single crystals of copper and silver. However, the vacuum systems available at that time was not good enough to properly control the surfaces, and it took almost forty years before these became available. Similarly, it was not until about 1965 that Sewell and Cohen demonstrated the power of reflection high-energy electron diffraction in a system with a very well controlled vacuum.

Further developments
Despite early successes such as the determination of the positions of hydrogen atoms in NH4Cl crystals by Laschkarew and Usykin in 1933, boric acid by Cowley in 1953 and orthoboric acid by  Zachariasen in 1954, electron diffraction for many years was a qualitative technique used to check samples within electron microscopes. John M Cowley puts this nicely in a 1968 paper: Thus was founded the belief, amounting in some cases almost to an article of faith, and persisting even to the present day, that it is impossible to interpret the intensities of electron diffraction patterns to gain structural information.Slowly this has changed, in transmission, reflection and at low energies. Some of the key developments have been:

Fast numerical methods based upon the Cowley-Moodie multislice algorithm, which only became possible once the fast Fourier transform (FFT) method was developed. With these and other numerical methods it became possible to calculate accurate, dynamical diffraction in seconds to minutes with laptops using widely available multislice programs.

Developments in the convergent-beam electron diffraction approach.  Building on the original work of Kossel and  Möllenstedt in 1939, it was extended by Goodman and Lehmpfuh, then mainly by the groups of Steeds and Tanaka who showed how to determine point groups and space groups. It can also be used for higher-level refinements of the electron density; for a brief history see CBED history. In many cases this is the best method to determine symmetry.

The development of new approaches to reduce dynamical effects such as precession electron diffraction and three-dimensional diffraction methods. Averaging over different directions has, empirically, been found to significantly reduce dynamical diffraction effects, e.g. See PED history for further details. Not only is it easier to identify known structures with this approach, it can also be used to solve unknown structures in some cases -- see precession electron diffraction for further information. 

The development of experimental methods exploiting ultra-high vacuum technologies (e.g. the approach described by Alpert in 1953) to better control surfaces, making low-energy electron diffraction and reflection high-energy electron diffraction more reliable and reproducible techniques. In the early days the surfaces were not well controlled; with these technologies they can both be cleaned and remain clean for hours to days, a key component of surface science. 
Fast and accurate methods to calculate intensities for low-energy electron diffraction so it could be used to determine atomic positions, for instance references. These have been extensively exploited to determine the structure of many surfaces, and the arrangement of foreign atoms on surfaces.
Methods to simulate the intensities in reflection high-energy electron diffraction, so it can be used semi-quantitatively to understand surfaces during growth and thereby to control the resulting materials. 
The development of advanced detectors for transmission electron microscopy such as charge-coupled device or direct electron detectors, improving the accuracy and reliability of intensity measurements. These have efficiencies and accuracies that can be a thousand or more times that of the photographic film used in the earliest experiments, with the information available in real time rather than requiring photographic processing after the experiment.

Basics of electron diffraction

Geometry of electron diffraction 

What is seen in an electron diffraction pattern depends upon the sample and also the energy of the electrons. The electrons need to be considered as waves, which can represented by describing the electron via a wavefunction as:

for a position . This is a quantum mechanics description; one cannot use a classical approach. The vector  is called the wavevector, has units of inverse nanometers, and the form above is called a plane wave as the term inside the exponential is constant on the surface of a plane. The vector  is also what is used when drawing ray diagrams.

For most cases the electrons are travelling at a respectable fraction of the speed of light, so rigorously need to be considered using relativistic quantum mechanics via the Dirac equation, which as spin does not normally matter can be reduced to the Klein–Gordon equation. Fortunately one can side-step many complications and use a non-relativistic approach based around the Schrödinger equation. Following Kunio Fujiwara and Archibald Howie, the relationship between the total energy of the electrons and the wavevector is written as:

 with 

where  is Planck's constant,  is a relativistic effective mass used to cancel out the relativistic terms for electrons of energy  with  the speed of light and  the rest mass of the electron. The concept of effective mass occurs throughout physics (see for instance Ashcroft and Mermin), and comes up in the behavior of quasiparticles. A common one is the electron hole, which acts as if it is a particle with a positive charge and a mass similar to that of an electron, although it can be several times lighter or heavier. For electron diffraction the electrons behave as if they are non-relativistic particles of mass  in terms of how they interact with the atoms.

The wavelength of the electrons  in vacuum is
,
and can range from about 0.1 nanometers, roughly the size of an atom, down to a thousandth of that. Typically the energy of the electrons is written in electronvolts (eV), the voltage used to accelerate the electrons; the actual energy of each electron is this voltage times the electron charge. For context, the typical energy of a chemical bond is a few eV; electron diffraction involves electrons from 100-5,000,000 eV.

The magnitude of the interaction of the electrons with a material scales as 
. 
While the wavevector increases as the energy increases, the change in the effective mass somewhat compensates this so even at the very high energies used in electron diffraction there are still significant interactions.

The high-energy electrons interact with the Coulomb potential, which for a crystal can be considered in terms of a Fourier series (see for instance Ashcroft and Mermin), that is

with  a reciprocal lattice vector and  the Fourier coefficient of the potential. The reciprocal lattice vector is often referred to in terms of Miller indices , a sum of the individual reciprocal lattice vectors  with integers  in the form:

The contribution from the  needs to be combined with what is called the shape function (e.g.), which is the Fourier transform of the shape of the object. If, for instance, the object is small in one dimension then the shape function extends far in that direction in the Fourier transform—a reciprocal relationship.

Around each reciprocal lattice point one then has this shape function. How much intensity there will be in the diffraction pattern depends upon the intersection of the Ewald sphere, that is energy conservation, and the shape function around each reciprocal lattice point -- see Figures 7, 18 and 20. The vector from a reciprocal lattice point to the Ewald sphere is called the excitation error . For transmission electron diffraction the samples used tend to be relatively thin, so most of the shape function is along the direction of the electron beam. For both LEED and RHEED the shape function is mainly normal to the surface of the sample. In LEED this results in (a simplification) back-reflection of the electrons leading to spots, see Figures 18 and 19 later, whereas in RHEED the electrons reflect off the surface at a small angle and typically yield diffraction patterns with streaks, see Figures 20 and 21 later. By comparison, with both x-ray and neutron diffraction the scattering is significantly weaker, so typically requires much larger crystals, in which case the shape function shrinks to just around the reciprocal lattice points, leading to simpler Bragg's law diffraction.

For all cases, when the reciprocal lattice points are close to the Ewald sphere (the excitation error is small) the intensity tends to be higher; when they are far away it tends to be smaller. The set of diffractions spots at right angles to the direction of the incident beam are called the zero-order Laue zone (ZOLZ) spots, as shown in Figure 7. One can also have intensities further out from reciprocal lattice points which are in a higher layer. The first of these is called the First order Laue zone (FOLZ); the series is called by the generic name Higher order Laue zone (HOLZ).

The end result is that the electron wave after it has been diffracted can be written as a integral over different plane waves:
,

that is a sum of plane waves going in different directions, each with a complex amplitude . For a crystalline sample these wavevectors have to be of the same magnitude, and are related to the incident direction  by

.

A diffraction pattern detects the intensities 

. 

For a crystal these will be near the reciprocal lattice points forming a two dimensional grid in many cases; in others they will be more widely distributed. Different samples and modes of diffraction give different results, as do different approximations.

A typical electron diffraction pattern using both TEM and LEED is a grid of high intensity spots (white) on a dark background, approximating a projection of the reciprocal lattice vectors, see Figures 1, 10, 11, 12 and 19 later. With conical illumination they can also be a grid of discs, see Figures 8, 10 and 16. RHEED is different, see Figures 20, 21 and the main article. If the excitation errors  were zero for every reciprocal lattice vector, then this grid would be at exactly the spacings of the reciprocal lattice vectors. This would be equivalent to a Bragg's law condition for all of them. In TEM  the wavelength is small and this is close to correct, but not exact. In addition, because the shape function can play a large role and also dynamical effects, they can be a few percent different from a regular array in some cases. In practice the deviation of the positions from a simple Bragg's law interpretation is often neglected, particularly if a column approximation is made (see below).

Kinematical diffraction
In Kinematical theory an approximation is made that the electrons are only scattered once, and it is common to make life simpler by also assuming a simple, flat sample. Going a little further, for transmission electron diffraction one typically assumes a constant thickness , what is called the Column Approximation (e.g. references and further reading). The intensity for each diffraction spot  is then:

The excitation error comes in as the outgoing wavevector  has to have the same modulus (i.e. energy) as the incoming wavevector . Of some importance, the intensity in transmission electron diffraction oscillates as a function of thickness, which can be confusing; there can similarly be intensity changes due to variations in orientation and also structural defects such as dislocations. If a diffraction spots is strong it could be because it has a larger structure factor, or it could be because the combination of thickness and excitation error is "right". Similarly the observed intensity can be small, even though the structure factor is large. This can complicate interpretation of the intensities. By comparison, these effects are much smaller in x-ray diffraction or neutron diffraction because they interact with matter far less and often one can simply use Bragg's law.

This form is a reasonable first approximation within about 20% in many cases, but it is critical to use much more accurate forms including multiple scattering of the electrons to properly understand the intensities. These approaches are called dynamical diffraction.

Dynamical diffraction

While kinematical diffraction is adequate to understand the geometry of the diffraction spots, it does not correctly give the intensities and has a number of other limitations. For a more complete approach one has to include multiple scattering of the electrons using methods that date back to the early work of Hans Bethe in 1928. These are based around solutions of the Schrödinger equation using the relativistic effective mass  described earlier. Even at very high energies dynamical diffraction is needed as the relativistic mass and wavelength partially cancel, so the role of the potential is larger than might be thought. 
The main components of this are:
 Include the scattering back into the incident beam from diffracted beams and between all others, not just single scattering from the incident beam to diffracted beams. This is important even for samples which are only a few atoms thick.
 Include at least semi-empirically the role of inelastic scattering by an imaginary component of the potential, also called an "optical potential". There is always inelastic scattering, and often it can have a major effect on both the background and sometimes the details, see Figure 8 and 16.
 Use higher-order numerical approaches to calculate the intensities such as multislice, matrix methods which are called Bloch-wave approaches or muffin-tin approaches. With these diffraction spots which are not present in kinematical theory can be present, e.g.
 Include effects due to elastic strain and defects, and also what Lindhard called the string potential. These are often important in transmission electron diffraction as well as other modalities.
 Include, for transmission electron microscopy, effects due to variations in the thickness of the sample and the normal to the surface. Samples often limit what can be done.
 Include, for both LEED and RHEED, effects due to the presence of surface steps, surface reconstructions and other atoms at the surface. Often these change the diffraction details significantly.  
 Include, for LEED, more careful analyses of the potential because contributions from exchange terms can be important. Without these the calculations may not be accurate enough.

Kikuchi lines

Kikuchi lines, first observed by Seishi Kikuchi in 1928, are linear features created by electrons scattered both inelastically and elastically. As the electron beam interacts with matter, the electrons are diffracted via elastic scattering, and also scattered inelastically losing part of their kinetic energy. These occur simultaneously, and cannot be separated – the Copenhagen interpretation. These electrons form Kikuchi lines which provide information on the orientation.

Kikuchi lines come in pairs forming Kikuchi bands, and are indexed in terms of the crystallographic planes they are connected to. The angular width of the band is equal to the diffraction vector , so in the diffraction pattern, the width of any  band will be equal to the distance between transmitted beam and  diffraction spot. The position of Kikuchi bands is fixed with respect to each other and the orientation of the sample, but not against the diffraction spots or the direction of the incident electron beam. As the crystal is tilted, the bands move on the diffraction pattern. Since the position of Kikuchi bands is quite sensitive to crystal orientation, they can be used to fine-tune a zone-axis orientation or determine crystal orientation with significantly higher accuracy than what is feasible with a spot diffraction analysis. They can also be used for navigation when changing the orientation between zone axes connected by some band, as illustrated in Figure 9. For those purposes, Kikuchi maps are available for many materials.

Types of electron diffraction

In a transmission electron microscope 

Electron diffraction in a transmission electron microscope (TEM) exploits the ability to form a very controlled electron beam using complex electron optics. Different types of diffraction experiments, for instance Figure 10, provide information such lattice constants, information on crystal defects, symmetries, and it can be used to solve an unknown crystal structure. As a general overview see the classic text by Edington, as well as the further reading.

It is common to combine it with other tools available in the microscope. Among other methods, TEM can provide images using selected diffraction beams, high-resolution images showing the atomic structure, chemical analysis through energy-dispersive x-ray spectroscopy, investigations of electronic structure and bonding through electron energy loss spectroscopy, and studies of the electrostatic potential through electron holography; this list is not exhaustive. Compared to another widely used material characterization technique, x-ray crystallography, TEM analysis is significantly more localized and can be used to obtain information from tens of thousands of atoms to just a few or even single atoms.

Formation of a diffraction pattern

In TEM, the electron beam passes through a thin film of the material as illustrated in Figure 11. Before and after the sample the beam is manipulated by various elements of the electron optics including magnetic lenses, deflectors and apertures; these act on the electrons similar to how glass lenses focus and control light. Optical elements above the sample are used to control the incident beam which can range from a wide and parallel beam to one which is a converging cone and can be smaller than an atom, 0.1 nm. As it interacts with the sample, part of the beam is diffracted and part is transmitted without changing its direction. Which part? This one can never say as electrons are everywhere until they are detected according to the Copenhagen interpretation.

Below the sample, the beam is controlled by another set of magnetic lens and apertures. Each set of initially parallel rays is focused by the first lens (objective) to a point in the back focal plane of this lens, forming a spot. The location of these spots is related to the interplanar distance in the sample. Other lenses below the sample can be used to produce a magnified image of the spots for all the different directions that the electrons leave the sample, a diffraction pattern. Alternatively they can form a magnified image of the sample. Modern microscopes allows one to switch between the imaging and diffraction mode by pressing a single button, which makes diffraction data easily available and accessible. In the sections below the focus is on collecting a magnified diffraction pattern; for other information see the pages on transmission electron microscopy and scanning transmission electron microscopy.

Selected area electron diffraction

The simplest diffraction technique in TEM is selected area electron diffraction (SAED) where the incident beam is wide and close to parallel. To select a particular region of interest from which the diffraction is collected, an aperture is used which is typically part of a thin foil of a heavy metal such as tungsten which has a number of small holes in it. This way diffraction information can be limited to, for instance, individual crystallites. Unfortunately the method is limited by the spherical aberration of the objective lens, so is only accurate for large grains with tens of thousands of atoms or more; for smaller regions a focused probe is needed..

If a parallel beam is used to acquire a diffraction pattern from a single-crystal, the result is similar to a two-dimensional projection of the crystal reciprocal lattice. From this one can determine interplanar distances and angles and in some cases crystal symmetry, particularly when the electron beam is down a major zone axis, see for instance the database by Jean-Paul Morniroli. In combination with modern automated analytical software such as CrysTBox, SAED can be used for a quantitative analysis with reasonable precision. However, projector lens aberrations such as barrel distortion as well as dynamical diffraction effects (e.g.) cannot be ignored. For instance, certain diffraction spots which are not present in x-ray diffraction can appear, for instance Gjønnes-Moodie extinction conditions. Hence x-ray diffraction remains the preferred method for precise lattice parameter measurements.

If the sample is tilted relative to the electron beam, different sets of crystallographic planes contribute to the pattern yielding different types of diffraction patterns, approximately different projections of the reciprocal lattice, see Figure 12. This can be used to determine the crystal orientation, which in turn can be used to set the orientation needed for a particular experiment, for instance to determine the misorientation between adjacent grains or crystal twins. Furthermore a series of diffraction patterns varying in tilt can be acquired and processed using a diffraction tomography approach. There are ways to combine this with direct methods algorithms using electrons and other methods such as charge flipping, or automated diffraction tomography to solve crystal structures.

Apart from limiting the beam using the selected area aperture, localization can be achieved by condensing the incident beam into a narrow probe. This technique is called microprobe or nanoprobe diffraction, or simply nanodiffraction. Probes of diameter smaller than 1 nm can be obtained. At these extremes the probe dimension comes at the price of the beam being nearly parallel, even though microprobe can be achieved with parallel beam. Compared to SAED, the resulting diffraction spots can be significantly broader, making a manual analysis less accurate. Accurate processing is possible with software, significantly improving accuracy and repeatability of the results.

Polycrystalline pattern

The character of the resulting diffraction pattern depends on whether the beam is diffracted by one single crystal or by a number of differently oriented crystallites, for instance in a polycrystalline material. If there are more contributing crystallites, the diffraction image is a superposition of individual crystal patterns, see Figure 13. With a large number of grains this superposition yields diffraction spots of all possible crystallographic plane systems in all possible orientations. This results in a pattern of concentric rings of discrete radii as shown in Figures 13 and 14.

Textured materials can be recognized by a non-uniform distribution of intensity around the ring. Ring diffraction patterns can be also used to discriminate between nanocrystalline and amorphous phases by careful analysis of the width of the diffraction rings. However, diffraction often cannot differentiate between very small grain polycrystalline materials and truly random order amorphous. Here high-resolution transmission electron microscopy and fluctuation electron microscopy can be more powerful, although this is still a topic of continuing development.

Multiple materials and double diffraction

In simple cases there is only one grain or one type of material in the area used for collecting a diffraction pattern. However, often there is more than one. If they are in different areas then the diffraction pattern will be a combination. In addition there can be one grain on top of another, in which case the electrons that go through the first are diffracted by the second. Electrons have no memory (like many of us), so after they have gone through the first grain and been diffracted, they traverse the second as if their current direction was that of the incident beam. This leads to diffraction spots which are the sum of those of the two (or even more) reciprocal lattices of the crystals, and can lead to quite complicated results. It can be difficult to know if this is  real and due to some novel material, or just a case where multiple crystals and diffraction is leading to odd results.

Convergent beam electron diffraction

In convergent beam electron diffraction (CBED), the incident electrons are focused in a converging cone-shaped beam with a crossover located at the sample, e.g. Figure 15, although other methods exist. Unlike the parallel beam, the convergent beam is able to carry information from the sample volume, not just a two-dimensional projection available in SAED. With convergent beam there is also no need for the selected area aperture, as it is inherently site-selective since the beam crossover is positioned at the object plane where the sample is located.

A CBED pattern consists of disks arranged exactly the same as the spots in SAED. Intensity within the disks, however, is not uniform, but represents dynamical diffraction effects and symmetries of the sample structure, see Figure 8 and 16. Even though the zone axis and lattice parameter analysis based on disk positions does not significantly differ from SAED, the analysis of disks content is significantly more complex. Due to a number of contributing factors, simulation based on dynamical diffraction theory is often required. As illustrated in Figure 16, the details within the disk change with sample thickness, as does the inelastic background. With appropriate analysis CBED patterns can be used for indexation of the crystal point group, space group identification, measurement of lattice parameters, thickness or strain.

The disk diameter can be controlled using the microscope optics and apertures. The larger is the angle, the broader the disks are with more features. If the angle is increased to significantly, the disks begin to overlap. This is avoided in large angle convergent electron beam diffraction (LACBED) where the sample is moved upwards or downwards. There are applications, however, where the overlapping disks are beneficial, for instance a ronchigram is as an example. It is a CBED pattern, often but not always of an amorphous material, with many intentionally overlapping disks providing information about the optical aberrations of the electron optical system.

Precession electron diffraction

Precession electron diffraction (PED), first developed by Vincent and Midgley in 1994, is a specialized method to collect electron diffraction patterns in a transmission electron microscope (TEM), see the main page for more information. By rotating (precessing) a tilted incident electron beam around the central axis of the microscope, a PED pattern is formed which is effectively an integration over a collection of diffraction conditions, see Figure 17. This produces a quasi-kinematical diffraction pattern that is more suitable as input into direct methods algorithms using electrons to determine the crystal structure of the sample. Because it avoids many dynamical effects it can also be used to better identify phases.

4D STEM

4D scanning transmission electron microscopy (4D STEM) is a subset of scanning transmission electron microscopy (STEM) methods which utilizes a pixelated electron detector to capture a convergent beam electron diffraction (CBED) pattern at each scan location; see above and the main page for further information. This technique captures a 2 dimensional reciprocal space image associated with each scan point as the beam rasters across a 2 dimensional region in real space, hence the name 4D STEM. Its development was enabled by better STEM detectors and improvements in computational power. The technique has applications in visual diffraction imaging, phase orientation and strain mapping, phase contrast analysis, among others; it has become very popular and rapidly evolving from about 2020 onwards.

The name 4D STEM is common in literature, however it is known by other names: 4D STEM EELS, ND STEM (N- since the number of dimensions could be higher than 4), position resolved diffraction (PRD), spatial resolved diffractometry, momentum-resolved STEM, "nanobeam precision electron diffraction", scanning electron nano diffraction, nanobeam electron diffraction, or pixelated STEM. Most of these are the same, although there are instances such as momentum-resolved STEM where the emphasis can be very different.

Low energy electron diffraction (LEED)

Low-energy electron diffraction (LEED) is a technique for the determination of the surface structure of single-crystalline materials by bombardment with a collimated beam of low-energy electrons (30–200 eV). In this case the Ewald sphere leads to approximately back-reflection, as illustrated in Figure 18, and diffracted electrons as spots on a fluorescent screen as shown in Figure 19; see the main page for more information and references. It has been used to solve a very large number of relatively simple surface structures of metals and semiconductors, plus cases with simple chemisorbants. For more complex cases transmission electron diffraction or surface x-ray diffraction have been used, often combined with scanning tunneling microscopy and density functional theory calculations.

LEED may be used in one of two ways:

 Qualitatively, where the diffraction pattern is recorded and analysis of the spot positions gives information on the symmetry of the surface structure. In the presence of an adsorbate the qualitative analysis may reveal information about the size and rotational alignment of the adsorbate unit cell with respect to the substrate unit cell.
 Quantitatively, where the intensities of diffracted beams are recorded as a function of incident electron beam energy to generate the so-called I–V curves. By comparison with theoretical curves, these may provide accurate information on atomic positions on the surface.

Reflection high energy electron diffraction (RHEED)

RHEED, see the main page for more information and reference, is a technique used to characterize the surface of crystalline materials by reflecting electrons off a surface as illustrated in Figure 20 and 21. RHEED systems gather information only from the surface layers of the sample, which distinguishes RHEED from other materials characterization methods that also rely on diffraction of high-energy electrons. Transmission electron microscopy, another common electron diffraction method, sample mainly the bulk of the sample due to the geometry of the system, although in special cases it can provide surface information. Low-energy electron diffraction (LEED) is also surface sensitive, but LEED achieves surface sensitivity through the use of low energy electrons. The main uses of RHEED to date have been during thin film growth, as the geometry is amenable to simultaneous collection of the diffraction data and deposition. It can, for instance, be used to monitor surface roughness during growth.

Diffraction by individual molecules in gases

Gas electron diffraction (GED) can be used to determine the geometry of molecules in gases. A gas carrying the molecules is exposed to the electron beam, which is diffracted by the molecules. Since the diffracting molecules are randomly oriented, the resulting diffraction pattern consists of broad concentric rings, see Figure 22. The diffraction intensity is a sum of several components such as background, atomic intensity or molecular intensity.

In GED the diffraction intensities at a particular diffraction angle  is described via so-called scattering variable defined as

The total intensity is then given as a sum of partial contributions:

Intensity  corresponds to the background which, unlike the previous contributions, must be determined experimentally. The intensity of atomic scattering  is defined as

Note that the vector  used here is not the same as the excitation error used in other areas of diffraction, see earlier.

The most valuable information is carried by the intensity of molecular scattering , as it contains information about the distance between all pairs of atoms in the molecule, whether bonded or not. It is given by 

where  is the distance between two atoms,  is the mean square amplitude of vibration between the two atoms, similar to a Debye–Waller factor,  is the anharmonicity constant and  a phase factor which is important for atomic pairs with very different nuclear charges. The summation is performed over all atom pairs. Atomic triplet intensity  is negligible in most cases. If the molecular intensity is extracted from an experimental pattern by subtracting other contributions, it can be used to match and refine a structural model against the experimental data.

In a scanning electron microscope

In a scanning electron microscope the region near the surface can be mapped using a electron beam that is scanned in a grid across the sample. A diffraction pattern can be recorded using electron backscatter diffraction (EBSD), as illustrated in Figure 23, captured with a camera inside the microscope. A depth from a few nanometers to a few microns, depending upon the electron energy used, is penetrated by the electrons, some of which are diffracted backwards and out of the sample. As result of combined inelastic and elastic scattering, typical features in an EBSD image are Kikuchi lines. Since the position of Kikuchi bands is highly sensitive to the crystal orientation, EBSD data can be used to determine the crystal orientation at particular locations of the sample. The data are processed by software yielding two-dimensional orientation maps. As the Kikuchi lines carry information about the interplanar angles and distances and, therefore, about the crystal structure, they can also be used for phase identification or strain analysis.

See also 

 Diffraction
 Convergent beam electron diffraction
 Microcrystal electron diffraction
 Precession electron diffraction
 Kikuchi line
 Ronchigram
 Electron backscatter diffraction
 Gas electron diffraction
 Low-energy electron diffraction
 Reflection high-energy electron diffraction
 Ultrafast electron diffraction
 Electron microscope
 Transmission electron microscopy
 Scanning transmission electron microscopy
 Scanning electron microscopy
 Electron crystallography
 CrysTBox
 Crystal structure
 Stereographic projection
 Zone axis

Notes

References

Further reading 
 Diffraction Physics, Cowley, J.M., North-Holland 1995, . Contains extensive coverage of kinematical and other diffraction.
 Electron microscopy of thin crystals by P. B. Hirsch, A. Howie, R. B. Nicholson, D. W. Pashley and M. J. Whelan, often called the bible of electron microscopy
 Electron Microdiffraction, J. C. H. Spence and J. M. Zuo, Springer, 1992, 
 High Energy Electron Diffraction and Microscopy, L.M. Peng, S.L. Dudarev, and M.J. Whelan, Oxford, 2011, . Extensive coverage of dynamical diffraction.
 

Diffraction
Electron
Quantum mechanics
Materials science